Ortopla is a genus of moths of the family Erebidae. The genus was erected by Francis Walker in 1859.

Species
Ortopla commutanda (Warren, 1891)
Ortopla iarbasalis Walker, [1859] Borneo
Ortopla lindsayi (Hampson, 1891) India (Tamil Nadu)
Ortopla noduna (Swinhoe, 1905) Sri Lanka
Ortopla relinquenda (Walker, 1858) northern India

References

Calpinae
Noctuoidea genera